The Roman Catholic Church in Greece is composed of 
 a Latin hierarchy,  comprising two ecclesiastical provinces (including four suffragan dioceses and an apostolic vicariate) and two dioceses immediately subject to the Holy See) 
 two Eastern Catholic rite-specific particular church sui iuris jurisdictions.

Current Latin Catholic hierarchy 

(Roman Rite)

Directly subject to the Holy See 
 Archdiocese of Athens 
 Archdiocese of Rhodes 
 Apostolic Vicariate of Thessaloniki

Ecclesiastical Province of Corfu, Zakynthos and Cefalonia 
 Archdiocese of Corfu, Zante and Cefalonia (nominal Metropolitan, no suffragan)

Ecclesiastical Province of Naxos, Andros, Tinos and Mykonos 
 Metropolitan Archdiocese of Naxos, Andros, Tinos and Mykonos 
Diocese of Chios 
Diocese of Crete
Diocese of Santorini
Diocese of Syros (and united titular see Milos)

Current Eastern Catholic jurisdictions 
All exempt, i.e. directly subject to the Holy See, and part of Rite-specific particular churches sui iuris

Greek Catholic Church (Byzantine Rite in Greek language)
 Greek Catholic Apostolic Exarchate of Greece, with cathedral see in Athens

Armenian Catholic Church (Armenian Rite in Armenian language)
 Armenian Catholic Ordinariate of Greece

Defunct dioceses

Titular Archbishoprics 
Metropolitan Titular Archbishoprics
 Corinth(us), Patrae (Veteres) (Patras), Traianopolis in Rhodope, Traianopolis in Rhodope
 TO BE WIKIFIED/CHECKED : Gortyna, Larissa in Thessalia, Mitylene, Nicopolis in Epiro, Novæ Patræ, Philippi, Thebæ (Thebes), Thessalonica

Non-metropolitan Titular Archbishoprics
 TO BE WIKIFIED/CHECKED : Ægina, Ænus, Carpathus, Cassiope, Cypsela, Lemnus, Leucas, Macra, Maronea, Massimianopolis in Rhodope, Methymna, Naupactus, Rhusium, Serræ

Titular bishoprics 
 TO BE WIKIFIED/CHECKED : Abdera, Achelous, Aëtus, Amphipolis, Amyclae, Anastasiopolis, Anastasiopolis, Arcadia, Ardamerium, Argos, Astypalæa, Aulon, Bargala, Berrhœa, Bolina, Bonitza, Cæsaropolis, Calydon, Campania, Canea, Cantanus, Cardicium, Carystus, Cassandria, Castoria, Cea, Cernitza, Cesarea in Thessalia, Chalcis in Græcia, Chersonesus in Creta, Christianopolis, Christopolis, Chrysopolis in Macedonia, Ciparissia, Cisamus, Citrus, Cnossus, Corone, Coronea, Cos, Cydonia, Daulia, Demetrias, Diocletiana, Dium, Doberus, Dodona, Dragobitia, Echinus, Edessa in Macedonia, Elatea, Eleutherna, Eleutheropolis in Macedonia, Elis, Epidaurum, Eressus, Eurœa in Epiro, Ezerus, Gomphi, Helos, Heraclea Pelagoniæ, Hierapytna, Hierissus, Ioannina, Ios, Kefalonia, Lacedæmonia, Lamia, Lappa, Lerus, Lete, Lidoricium, Maina, Marmarizana, Megalopolis in Peloponneso, Megara, Messene, Methone, Milos (united with current diocese of Syros), Monembasia, Mosynopolis, Mundinitza, Nauplia, Nisyrus, Olena, Opus, Oreus, Paros, Peritheorium, Pharsalus, Photice, Platæa (Plataia), Platamon, Polystylus, Porthmus, Rheon, Rhithymna (former diocese of Retimo(–Ario)), Salona, Samos, Scarphea, Sciathus, Scopelus in Thessalia, Scyrus, Serbia, Setea, Sicyon, Stagoi, Stobi, Strongyle, Strumnitza, Subrita, Tanagra, Tegea, Thasus, Thaumacus, Thebæ Phthiotides, Thespiæ, Tricca, Trœzene, Velicia, Xanthe, Zapara, Zaratovium

Other defunct jurisdictions 
Latin 
 Roman Catholic Diocese of Andros
 Roman Catholic Diocese of Hierapetra
 Roman Catholic Diocese of Hierapetra and Sitia
 Roman Catholic Diocese of Malvasia
 Roman Catholic Diocese of Negroponte
 Apostolic Prefecture of Rhodes and adjacent islands
 Roman Catholic Diocese of Sitia
 Roman Catholic Diocese of Tinos / Roman Catholic Diocese of Tinos-Mykonos

Eastern Catholic (Byzantine Rite) 
 Bulgarian Catholic Apostolic Vicariate of Constantinople 
 Bulgarian Catholic Apostolic Vicariate of Macedonia

See also 
 List of Catholic dioceses (structured view)
 List of Catholic dioceses (alphabetical)

Sources and external links 
 GCatholic.org.
 Catholic-Hierarchy entry.

Greece religion-related lists
Greece